Hey, Happy! is a Canadian science fiction comedy film, directed by Noam Gonick and released in 2001.

Set in a countercultural squatter camp on the outskirts of Winnipeg, the film stars Jérémie Yuen as Sabu, a bisexual rave disc jockey on a quest to have sex with 2,000 men before the imminent apocalyptic flood of the Red River. After successfully bedding 1,999 men, he sets his sights on Happy (Craig Aftanis) as his final conquest, only to be drawn into a love triangle with rival Spanky (Lexi Tronic, credited as Clayton Godson).

The film premiered at the 2001 Sundance Film Festival. It had its Canadian premiere at the Inside Out Film and Video Festival, where it won the award for Best Canadian Film. In its subsequent Canadian theatrical release, it was screened with Guy Maddin's short film The Heart of the World.

Critical response
Writing for the Toronto Star, Geoff Pevere wrote that "If Gonick's first feature film (he directed the award-winning documentary about filmmaker Guy Maddin called Waiting for Twilight) registers anything with prairie twilight clarity, it's expertly orchestrated chaos: as individually anarchic as any of the movie's set-pieces may seem- and the one involving "Magnolia Thunderpussy's Filipino witchcraft shack" is merely one- they're rendered with a cinematic skill that gives the rules behind the gameplaying away. Whether or not you "get" this flagrantly anti-linear movie, there's no missing the artfulness behind it."

For the National Post, Stephen Cole panned the film, writing that "none of [its cast], amateurs all, show any aptitude for performing (Godson acts about as well as Sex Pistol Sid Vicious played bass), although inarticulate Yuen, who is forever pulling the hair out of his eyes, is an intriguing camera subject-hunk in the tradition of Warhol's Joe Dallesandro."

In his 2006 book The Romance of Transgression in Canada: Queering Sexualities, Nations, Cinemas, Thomas Waugh wrote that the film was essentially a postmodern update of John Greyson's 1996 film Lilies, "but this one substitutes upbeat prairie rave euphoria for Quebec martyr melodrama".

References

External links
 

2001 films
Films shot in Winnipeg
2000s science fiction comedy films
Canadian science fiction comedy films
English-language Canadian films
Canadian LGBT-related films
2001 LGBT-related films
LGBT-related science fiction comedy films
Films directed by Noam Gonick
Films set in Winnipeg
Squatting in film
2000s English-language films
2000s Canadian films